Svend Haugaard (1913–2003), was a Danish politician and party leader. Member of Folketinget for the Social Liberal Party 1964–1979. Agronomist. Headmaster of an agricultural high school. Was part of a leftist oppositional party faction during the party leadership of Hilmar Baunsgaard. Followed the latter as party leader but achieved a poor election result in February 1977. Haugaard had a lifelong personal and organizational commitment to pacifism. In translation, his memoirs from 1989 are called No words without deeds.

External links
Biographical notes from the Danish Peace Academy and a picture from the cover of Haugaard's memoirs 

1913 births
2003 deaths
Danish Social Liberal Party politicians
Members of the Folketing
Leaders of the Danish Social Liberal Party